Nocturnal is the debut studio album by American hip hop duo Heltah Skeltah. It was released on June 18, 1996 via Duck Down/Priority Records. Recording sessions took place at Chung King Studios, at Dollar Cab, at D&D Studios, and at Unique Recording Studios in New York City. Production was handled by Da Beatminerz, Buckshot, Shaleek, Shawn J. Period, Supreme, E-Swift, Lord Jamar and Sean Price. It features guest appearances from Originoo Gunn Clappaz, Illa Noyz, Representativz and Vinia Mojica. The album peaked at number 35 on the Billboard 200 and number 5 on the Top R&B/Hip-Hop Albums.

Background 

The two made their debut on Smif-N-Wessun's 1995 album Dah Shinin'. Same year the duo teamed up with O.G.C. to form The Fab 5, and released the single "Blah" b/w "Leflaur Leflah Eshkoshka". "Leflah", which is included in the album, peaked at number 75 on the Billboard Hot 100 and became the biggest hit from the Boot Camp family to date. "Leflah" was re-released as an A-Side single in early 1996, featuring the first sole Heltah Skeltah track, "Letha Brainz Blo", as its B-Side. The first official single released from the album was "Operation Lock Down", produced by Tha Alkaholiks' E-Swift. Other singles released from the album were "Therapy" and "Da Wiggy".

The "Twin Towers" of the Boot Camp Clik gained much recognition and respect in the Hip Hop world with the release of their debut, now hailed as a 90's Hip Hop classic. Led by Rock's rough, booming voice and Ruck's strong lyrical ability, and backed by dark, grimy beats by Da Beatminerz, Shaleek, and others, the release received wide acclaim in the Hip Hop world, but didn't reach much further, selling around 250,000 copies in the US.

Track listing 

Sample credits
Track 2 contains samples from "The Look of Love" by Johnny Pate
Track 3 contains samples from "Soul Girl" by Jeanne & the Darlings
Track 13 contains samples from "Uzuri" by Catalyst
Track 14 contains samples from "Danube Incident" by Lalo Schifrin
Track 15 contains samples from "I Cover the Waterfront" and "Blame It on My Youth" by Gloria Lynne
Track 16 contains samples from "Theme From Summer of '42" by George Benson

Album singles

Music videos 
 "Leflaur Leflah Eshkoshka" Director: Marcus Turner Released: 1995
 "Operation Lock Down" Released: 1996
 "Therapy" Director: Gobi NajedReleased: 1996

Charts

Weekly charts

Year-end charts

Singles chart positions

References

External links

1996 debut albums
Heltah Skeltah albums
Duck Down Music albums
Priority Records albums
Albums produced by Da Beatminerz
Albums recorded at Chung King Studios